Who's Your Step Daddy is the debut album released by Australian hip hop group Funkoars in 2003. The album was released by Peepshow Entertainment and distributed by Obese Records. The album contains numerous pornographic references and their outrageous and passionate lyrics are potentially aimed at confronting or offending listeners. Following its release promoters started approaching Funkoars to book them for live performances, resulting in the group extensively touring Australia for three years before releasing a second album in 2006.

Brand, from In the Mix, introduced their album, "just honest to goodness Hip-Hop made by those who love it. The Funkoars definitely love it, their latest release Who’s Your Stepdaddy is crammed to the rim with thick, ass wiggling jams laced with intricate and comedic rhymes".

In 2011 the album was re-released digitally through iTunes, the album was also released in instrumental format for the first time.

Track listing

Release history

References

Obese Records albums
2003 debut albums
Funkoars albums